The Yn tephra is a geologically recent tephra deposit that covers portions of the U.S. state of Washington and the Canadian provinces of British Columbia and Alberta. It was created by the largest known volcanic eruption from Mount St. Helens, having taken place in possibly 1860 BCE as part of the Smith Creek eruptive period. The tephra consists of pumiceous dacite.

References

Volcanism of Washington (state)
Geologic formations of British Columbia
Geologic formations of Alberta
Mount St. Helens
VEI-6 eruptions
Volcanic eruptions in the United States
Prehistoric volcanic events
Plinian eruptions